Mabel Segun, NNOM (born 1930) is a Nigerian poet, playwright and writer of short stories and children's books. She has also been a teacher, broadcaster, and a sportswoman.

Biography
Born in Ondo City, Nigeria,  she had her secondary school education at CMS Girl's School Lagos. She attended the University of Ibadan, graduating in 1953 with a BA in English, Latin and History. She taught these subjects in Nigerian schools, and later became Head of the Department of English and Social Studies and Vice-Principal at the National Technical Teachers' College, Yaba (Now Yaba College of Technology). Her first book, My Father's Daughter (1965), published in 1965, has been widely used as a literature text in schools all over the world, and her books have been translated into German, Danish, Norwegian and Greek. Her work is included in the anthology Daughters of Africa (1992).

Segun has championed children's literature in Nigeria through the Children's Literature Association of Nigeria, which she founded in 1978, and the Children's Documentation and Research Centre, which she set up in 1990 in Ibadan. She is also a fellow of the International Youth Library in Munich, Germany.

She was a co-founder of the Association of Nigerian Authors.

Awards and honours
As a broadcaster, Segun won the Nigerian Broadcasting Corporation 1977 Artiste of the Year award.

In 2009, she received the Nigerian National Order of Merit Award for lifetime achievements.

In 2015, the Society of Young Nigerian Writers under the leadership of Wole Adedoyin founded the Mabel Segun Literary Society (www.mabelsegunaliterarysociety.blogspot.com), aimed at promoting and reading the works of Mabel Segun.

In 2007, Segun was awarded the LNG Nigeria Prize for Literature.

Selected bibliography

My Father's Daughter (1965)
Under the Mango Tree (co-edited) (1979)
Youth Day Parade (1984)
Olu and the Broken Statue (1985)
Sorry, No Vacancy (1985)
Conflict and Other Poems (1986)
My Mother's Daughter (1986)
Ping-Pong: Twenty-Five Years of Table Tennis (1989)
The First Corn (1989)
The Twins and the Tree Spirits (1990)
The Surrender and Other Stories (1995)
Readers' Theatre: Twelve Plays for Young People (2006)
Rhapsody: A Celebration of Nigerian Cooking and Food Culture (2007)

References

External links

 "Mabel Segun 1930 to the Present", Facebook, 20 August 2012.

1930 births
Living people
Yoruba children's writers
People from Ondo City
University of Ibadan alumni
20th-century Nigerian women writers
Nigerian women educators
Yoruba educators
English-language writers from Nigeria
Yoruba poets
Nigerian women poets
Nigerian children's writers
Writers from Ondo State
Nigerian women children's writers
Recipients of the Nigerian National Order of Merit Award
20th-century Nigerian poets
Yoruba women writers
St Anne's School, Ibadan alumni
Nigeria Prize for Literature winners
 Yoruba people